The Medvezhyi Islands, or Bear Islands (Eheleex Arıılar) is an uninhabited group of islands at the western end of the Kolyma Gulf of the East Siberian Sea.

History
The first recorded European to report the existence of the Medvezhyi Islands was Russian explorer Yakov Permyakov in 1710. While sailing from the Lena to the Kolyma River, Permyakov observed the silhouette of the unknown island group in the then little explored East Siberian Sea.

In 1820-1824, during Ferdinand Wrangel's Arctic expedition to the East Siberian Sea and the Chukchi Sea, Arctic explorer Fyodor Matyushkin surveyed and mapped Chetyryokhstolbovoy Island in the Medvezhyi group.

On September 3, 1878, Adolf Erik Nordenskiöld recorded that he sailed close to the island group in the steamship Vega. This report was made during the famous expedition that made the whole length of the Northeast passage for the first time in history.

The group was also explored during the Arctic Ocean Hydrographic Expedition of 1910–1915.

Geography
They are part of the East Siberian Lowland.

The sea surrounding the Medvezhyi Islands is covered with fast ice in the winter and the climate is severe. The surrounding sea is obstructed by pack ice even in the summer months. There is commercial fishing in the area of the islands during the summer.

This island group is a part of the territory of the Sakha Republic of Russia. As their name indicates, these islands are a refuge and breeding ground for polar bears.

Islands
There are six islands in the group: Krestovsky, Leontyev, Pushkarev, Lysova, Andreev and Chetyryokhstolbovoy, where there is a polar station which was inaugurated in 1933. 
The islands are formed of stacked granite, clay and shale. They are mostly covered with tundra vegetation.

Climate

Features of the islands

See also
List of research stations in the Arctic
Fyodor Matyushkin
Amateur Radio Expedition to Leontyeva Island, Medvezhyi Islands RI0LI

References

Archipelagoes of the East Siberian Sea
Archipelagoes of the Sakha Republic
Uninhabited islands of Russia